Yadanabon University is a public liberal arts and sciences university in Mandalay, Myanmar. Located in the outskirts of Mandalay in Amarapura by Taungthaman Lake, the university offers bachelor's and master's degree programs in liberal arts and sciences, mostly to students from Mandalay suburbs and vicinity.

History
Yadanabon University was opened in 2000 as Yadanabon College in Amarapura in southern Mandalay to serve students from the city's surround suburbs. The move was widely believed to be part of the Burmese military government's plan to disperse university students across many universities and colleges around the country. All arts and science universities in Myanmar, attended by the bulk of the university students, were closed down from December 1996 to July 2000, following student demonstrations in Yangon. When the universities reopened in 2000, students who would have attended Mandalay University in central Mandalay now have to attend Yadanabon University.

In 2003, Yadanabon College was "upgraded" to Yadanabon University by the military government. The first convocation of the Yadanabon University was held in January 2003. The university conferred degrees on 4,148 graduates.

Programs
Classified as an Arts and Science university in the Burmese university education system, Yadanabon University offers bachelor's and master's degree programs in common liberal arts and sciences disciplines. Its regular Bachelor of Arts (BA) and Bachelor of Science (BSc) degrees take four years to complete and honors degree programs BA (Hons) and BSc (Hons) take one years. The master's degree programs take two years.

Alumni 
 Zeyar Thaw, Former political prisoner; MP, Pyithu Hluttaw (2012–2021)

References

External links 
 University website
 Yadanabon University on Facebook

Universities and colleges in Mandalay
Arts and Science universities in Myanmar
Universities and colleges in Myanmar